Panagiotis Tzimas (born 12 March 2001) is a Greek professional footballer who plays as a midfielder for Super League club PAS Giannina, on loan from PAOK B.

Career 

On 10 July 2021, Greek Super League club PAOK B announced the signing of Tzimas, who was transferred to PAOK from Asteras Tripolis, with his former club retaining profit percentage rights in a resale of the player by PAOK.

Career statistics

Club

Notes

References

2001 births
Living people
Greek footballers
Greece youth international footballers
Association football midfielders
Asteras Tripolis F.C. players
PAOK FC players
PAOK FC B players
PAS Giannina F.C. players
Super League Greece players
Super League Greece 2 players
Footballers from Preveza